The Los Angeles Philharmonic, commonly referred to as the LA Phil, is an American orchestra based in Los Angeles, California. It has a regular season of concerts from October through June at the Walt Disney Concert Hall, and a summer season at the Hollywood Bowl from July through September. Gustavo Dudamel is the current music director, Esa-Pekka Salonen is conductor laureate, Zubin Mehta is conductor emeritus, and Susanna Mälkki is principal guest conductor. John Adams is the orchestra's current composer-in-residence.

Music critics have described the orchestra as the most "contemporary minded", "forward thinking", "talked about and innovative", and "venturesome and admired" orchestra in America. According to Salonen:

 "We are interested in the future. we are not trying to re-create the glories of the past, like so many other symphony orchestras." 

The orchestra's former chief executive officer, Deborah Borda, comparably stated:

 "Especially since we moved into the new hall, our intention has been to integrate 21st-century music into the orchestra's everyday activity." 

Since the opening of the Walt Disney Concert Hall on October 23, 2003, the Los Angeles Philharmonic has presented 57 world premieres, one North American premiere, and 26 U.S. premieres, and has commissioned or co-commissioned 63 new works.

History

1919–1933: Founding the Philharmonic

The orchestra was founded and single-handedly financed in 1919 by William Andrews Clark, Jr., a copper baron, arts enthusiast, and part-time violinist. He originally asked Sergei Rachmaninoff to be the Philharmonic's first music director; however, Rachmaninoff had only recently moved to New York, and he did not wish to move again. Clark then selected Walter Henry Rothwell, former assistant to Gustav Mahler, as music director, and hired away several principal musicians from East Coast orchestras and others from the competing and soon-to-be defunct Los Angeles Symphony. The orchestra played its first concert in the Trinity Auditorium in the same year, eleven days after its first rehearsal. Clark himself would sometimes sit and play with the second violin section.

After Rothwell's death in 1927, subsequent Music Directors in the decade of the 1920s included Georg Schnéevoigt and Artur Rodziński.

1933–1950: Harvey Mudd rescues orchestra
Otto Klemperer became Music Director in 1933, part of the large group of German emigrants fleeing Nazi Germany. He conducted many LA Phil premieres, and introduced Los Angeles audiences to important new works by Igor Stravinsky and Arnold Schoenberg. The orchestra responded well to his leadership, but Klemperer had a difficult time adjusting to Southern California, a situation exacerbated by repeated manic-depressive episodes.

Things were further complicated when founder William Andrews Clark died without leaving the orchestra an endowment. The newly formed Southern California Symphony Association was created with the goal to stabilize the orchestra's funding, with the association's president, Harvey Mudd, stepping up to personally guarantee Klemperer's salary. The Philharmonic's concerts at the Hollywood Bowl also brought in much needed revenue. With that, the orchestra managed to make it through the worst of the Great Depression years still intact.

Then, after completing the 1939 summer season at the Hollywood Bowl, Klemperer was visiting Boston and was incorrectly diagnosed with a brain tumor, and the subsequent brain surgery left him partially paralyzed. He went into a depressive state and was institutionalized. When he escaped, The New York Times ran a cover story declaring him missing. After he was found in New Jersey, a picture of him behind bars was printed in the New York Herald Tribune. He subsequently lost the post of Music Director, though he still would occasionally conduct the Philharmonic. He led some important concerts, such as the orchestra's premiere performance of Stravinsky's Symphony in Three Movements in 1946.

John Barbirolli was offered the position of Music Director after his contract with the New York Philharmonic expired in 1942. He declined the offer and chose to return to England instead. The following year, Alfred Wallenstein was chosen by Mudd to lead the orchestra. The former principal cellist of the New York Philharmonic, he had been the youngest member of the Los Angeles Philharmonic when it was founded in 1919. He turned to conducting at the suggestion of Arturo Toscanini. He had conducted the L.A. Philharmonic at the Hollywood Bowl on a number of occasions and, in 1943, took over as Music Director. Among the highlights of Wallenstein's tenure were recordings of concertos with fellow Angelenos, Jascha Heifetz and Arthur Rubinstein.

1951–1968: Dorothy Buffum Chandler's influence
By the mid-1950s, department store heiress and wife of the publisher of the Los Angeles Times, Dorothy Buffum Chandler became the de facto leader of the orchestra's board of directors. Besides leading efforts to create a performing arts center for the city that would serve as the Philharmonic's new home, and would eventually lead to the Los Angeles Music Center, she and others wanted a more prominent conductor to lead the orchestra; after Wallenstein's departure, Chandler led efforts to hire then Concertgebouw Orchestra principal conductor, Eduard van Beinum as the LAPO music director. The Philharmonic's musicians, management and audience all loved Beinum, but in 1959, he suffered a massive heart attack while on the podium during a rehearsal of the Concertgebouw Orchestra and died.

In 1960, the orchestra, led again by Chandler, signed Georg Solti to a three-year contract to be music director after he had guest conducted the orchestra in winter concerts downtown, at the Hollywood Bowl, and in other Southern California locations including CAMA concerts in Santa Barbara. Solti was to officially begin his tenure in 1962, and the Philharmonic had hoped that he would lead the orchestra when it moved into its new home at the then yet-to-be-completed Dorothy Chandler Pavilion; he even began to appoint musicians to the orchestra. However, Solti abruptly resigned the position in 1961 without officially taking the post after learning that the Philharmonic board of directors failed to consult him before naming then 26-year-old Zubin Mehta to be assistant conductor of the orchestra. Mehta was subsequently named to replace Solti.

1969–1997: Ernest Fleischmann's tenure

In 1969, the orchestra hired Ernest Fleischmann to be Executive Vice President and General Manager. During his tenure, the Philharmonic instituted a number of then-revolutionary ideas, including the creation of the Los Angeles Philharmonic Chamber Music Society and the Los Angeles Philharmonic New Music Group and its "Green Umbrella" concerts; both of these adjunct groups were composed of the orchestra's musicians but offered performance series which were separate and distinct from traditional Philharmonic concerts. They were eventually imitated by other orchestras throughout the world. This concept was ahead of its time, and was an outgrowth of Fleischmann's philosophy, most famously laid out in his 16 May 1987 commencement address at the Cleveland Institute of Music entitled, "The Orchestra is Dead. Long Live the Community of Musicians."

When Zubin Mehta left for the New York Philharmonic in 1978, Fleischmann convinced Carlo Maria Giulini to take over as Music Director. Giulini's time with the orchestra was well regarded, however, he resigned the position after his wife became ill, and returned to Italy.

In 1985, Fleischmann turned to André Previn with the hopes that his conducting credentials and time spent at Hollywood Studios would add a local flair and enhance the connection between conductor, orchestra, and city. While Previn's tenure was musically satisfactory, other conductors including Kurt Sanderling, Simon Rattle, and Esa-Pekka Salonen, fared better at the box office. Previn clashed frequently with Fleischmann; one such conflict occurred over Fleischmann's failure to consult Previn over the decision to name Salonen as "Principal Guest Conductor", a move mirroring the prior Solti/Mehta controversy. Because of Previn's objections, the position and Japan tour offer made to Salonen were withdrawn; however, shortly thereafter in April 1989, Previn resigned, and four months later, Salonen was named Music Director Designate, officially taking the post in October 1992. Salonen's U.S. conducting debut with the orchestra had been in 1984.

Salonen's tenure with the orchestra first began with a residency at the 1992 Salzburg Festival in concert performances and as the pit orchestra in a production of the opera Saint François d'Assise by Olivier Messiaen; it was the first time an American orchestra was given that opportunity. Salonen later took the orchestra on many other tours of the United States, Europe, and Asia, and residencies at the Lucerne Festival in Switzerland, The Proms in London, in Cologne for a festival of Salonen's own works, and in 1996 at the Théâtre du Châtelet in Paris for a Stravinsky festival conducted by Salonen and Pierre Boulez. It was during the Paris residency that key Philharmonic board members heard the orchestra perform in improved acoustics and were reinvigorated to lead fundraising efforts for the soon-to-be-built Walt Disney Concert Hall.

Under Salonen's leadership, the Philharmonic has become an extremely progressive and well-regarded orchestra. Alex Ross of The New Yorker said:

1998–2009
When Fleischmann decided to retire in 1998 after 28 years at the helm, the orchestra named Willem Wijnbergen as its new Executive Director. Wijnbergen, a Dutch pianist and arts administrator, was the managing director of the Concertgebouw Orchestra in Amsterdam. Initially, his appointment was hailed as a major coup for the orchestra.

One of his most important decisions was to modify Hollywood Bowl programming: he increased the number of jazz concerts and appointed John Clayton serving as the orchestra's first Jazz Chair; in addition, he established a new World Music series with Tom Schnabel as programming director Despite some successes, Wijnbergen left the orchestra in 1999 after only one controversy-filled year, and it is unclear whether he resigned or was fired by the Philharmonic's board of directors.

Later that same year, Deborah Borda, then the Executive Director of the New York Philharmonic, was hired to take over executive management of the orchestra. She began her tenure in January 2000, and was later given the title of President and Chief Executive Officer. After financial problems experienced during Wijnbergen's short tenure, Borda — "a formidable executive who runs the orchestra like a lean company, not like a flabby non-profit" — "put the organization on solid financial footing." She is widely credited (along with Salonen, Frank Gehry, and Yasuhisa Toyota) for the orchestra's very successful move to Walt Disney Concert Hall, and for wholeheartedly supporting and complementing Salonen's artistic vision. One example cited by Alex Ross:

Perhaps Borda's boldest notion is to give visiting composers such as [John] Adams and Thomas Adès the same royal treatment that is extended to the likes of Yo-Yo Ma and Joshua Bell; Borda talks about "hero composers." A recent performance of Adams's monumental California symphony "Naïve and Sentimental Music" in the orchestra's Casual Fridays series ... drew a nearly full house. Borda's big-guns approach has invigorated the orchestra's long-running new-music series, called Green Umbrella, which Fleischmann established in 1982. In the early days, it drew modest audiences, but in recent years attendance has risen to the point where as many as sixteen hundred people show up for a concert that in other cities might draw thirty or forty. The Australian composer Brett Dean recently walked onstage for a Green Umbrella concert and did a double-take, saying that it was the largest new-music audience he'd ever seen.

On July 13, 2005, a young Venezuelan conductor, Gustavo Dudamel, made his debut with the LA Phil at the orchestra's summer home, the Hollywood Bowl. In his U.S. debut Tuesday night, a 24-year-old conductor from Venezuela with curly hair, long sideburns and a baby face accomplished something increasingly rare and difficult at the Hollywood Bowl. He got a normally restive audience's full, immediate and rapt attention. And he kept it.

On January 4, 2007, Dudamel made his Walt Disney Concert Hall debut with the LA Phil prompting Los Angeles Times critic Mark Swed to write, "Greatness like this doesn't come around often." A few months later, on April 9, 2007, the symphony board announced that Esa-Pekka Salonen would step down as the LAP's music director at the end of the 2008–2009 season, and Gustavo Dudamel would succeed him. In 2007, two years before Dudamel's official start as music director, the LA Phil established YOLA (Youth Orchestra Los Angeles). "The model for YOLA – a nonprofit initiative that supplies underprivileged children with free instruments, instruction, and profound lessons about pride, community, and commitment – is El Sistema, Venezuela's national music training program which, 27 years ago, nurtured the talents of a 5-year-old violin prodigy named Gustavo." Just before the beginning of his inaugural season with the LA Phil, Dudamel, on May 11, 2009, was included as a finalist in Time'''s "The Time 100: The World's Most Influential People."

2009–present
Gustavo Dudamel began his official tenure as music director of the Los Angeles Philharmonic in 2009 with concerts at both the Hollywood Bowl (¡Bienvenido Gustavo!) on October 3, 2009 and the Inaugural Gala at Walt Disney Concert Hall on October 8, 2009. In 2010 and 2011, Dudamel and the LA Phil received the Morton Gould Award for Innovative Programming by the American Society of Composers, Authors and Publishers (ASCAP).  In 2012, Dudamel and the orchestra won the first place Award for Programming Contemporary Music by ASCAP. 

In 2012, Dudamel, the Los Angeles Philharmonic and the Simón Bolívar Symphony Orchestra of Venezuela performed all nine of Mahler's symphonies over the course of three weeks in Los Angeles and one week in Caracas, "a mammoth tribute to the composer," and "an unprecedented conducting feat for the conductor." That same year, the orchestra launched a three-year project to present the Mozart/Da Ponte operas, directed by Christopher Alden, with each designed in collaboration with famous architects (sets) and clothing designers (costumes). The series launched in 2012 with Frank Gehry and Rodarte designing Don Giovanni and continued in 2013 with Jean Nouvel and Azzedine Alaïa designing Le Nozze di Figaro.  In 2014, the featured designers for the Così fan tutte production were Zaha Hadid and Hussein Chalayan.

In October 2011, Dudamel was named Gramophone Artist of the Year. In 2012, Dudamel and the LA Phil were awarded a Grammy award for Best Orchestral Performance for their recording of Brahms' Fourth Symphony. Dudamel was also named Musical America's 2013 Musician of the Year.  In 2020 and 2021, Dudamel and the LA Phil were awarded consecutive Grammy awards for Best Orchestral Performance for their recordings of Andrew Norman's Sustain (2020), and for the collected symphonies of Charles Ives (2021).

In February 2023, the orchestra announced that Dudamel is to conclude his tenure as its music director at the close of his current contract, at the end of the 2025-2026 season.

Performance venues

The orchestra played its first season at Trinity Auditorium at Grand Ave and Ninth Street. In 1920, it moved to Fifth Street and Olive Ave, in a venue that had previously been known as Clune's Auditorium, but was renamed Philharmonic Auditorium. From 1964 to 2003, the orchestra played its main subscription concerts in the Dorothy Chandler Pavilion of the Los Angeles Music Center. In 2003, it moved to the new Walt Disney Concert Hall designed by Frank Gehry adjacent to the Chandler. Its current "winter season" runs from October through late May or early June.

Since 1922, the orchestra has played outdoor concerts during the summer at the Hollywood Bowl, with the official "summer season" running from July through September.

The LA Philharmonic has played at least one concert a year in its sister city, Santa Barbara, presented by the Community Arts Music Association (CAMA), along with other regular concerts throughout various Southern California cities such as Costa Mesa as part of the Orange County Philharmonic Society's series, San Diego, Palm Springs, among many others. In addition, the orchestra plays a number of free community concerts throughout Los Angeles County.

Conductors

Music Directors

Georg Solti accepted the post in 1960, but resigned in 1961 without officially beginning his tenure.

Conductor Laureate
2009–present Esa-Pekka Salonen

Before Salonen's last concert as Music Director of the Los Angeles Philharmonic on April 19, 2009, the orchestra announced his appointment as its first ever Conductor Laureate "as acknowledgement of our profound gratitude to him and to signify our continuing connection." In response, Salonen said:

When the Board asked me if I would accept the position of Conductor Laureate I was overwhelmed. This organization has been at the very center of my musical life for 17 years. I am very proud and honored that they would even consider me for such a prestigious title and it gives me great pleasure to accept. The Los Angeles Philharmonic will always play an important role in my life and this is a symbol of our continuing relationship.

Conductor Emeritus
2019–present Zubin Mehta

During intermission of a concert on January 3, 2019, Simon Woods (CEO of the orchestra) announced that Zubin Mehta was being given the title of Conductor Emeritus, saying: "Zubin Mehta is one of the treasures of the classical world. He was responsible for hiring over 80 musicians during his tenure at the LA Phil, and it was during this remarkable era that the orchestra rose to a position of international prominence and launched a commitment to deep community engagement that was truly ahead of its time. Today’s appointment is an acknowledgment of that incredible past and rich present, and a signal of our profound gratitude for the role he has played in shaping this orchestra."

Mehta commented: "This is indeed a great honor and I’m very pleased to accept. The Los Angeles Philharmonic has always held a very special place in my heart; they took a chance and accepted me as a very young conductor. I remain grateful to the orchestra and I’m happy to continue our relationship in this way."

Principal Guest Conductors

Rattle and Tilson Thomas were named Principal Guest Conductor concurrently under Carlo Maria Giulini, though Tilson Thomas's tenure ended much earlier. Until 2016, they were the only two conductors to officially hold the title as such (though as stated above, Esa-Pekka Salonen was initially offered the position under Previn before having the offer withdrawn).

Beginning in the summer of 2005, the Philharmonic created the new position of Principal Guest Conductor of the Los Angeles Philharmonic at the Hollywood Bowl. Leonard Slatkin was initially given a two-year contract, and in 2007 he was given a one-year extension. In March 2008, Bramwell Tovey was named to the post for an initial two-year contract beginning Summer of 2008; he subsequently received a one-year extension. After Tovey's term ended, no conductor has since held the position at the Hollywood Bowl.

In April 2016, the LA Phil announced Susanna Mälkki as the orchestra's next principal guest conductor, the first woman to be named to the post, beginning with the 2017-2018 season, with an initial contract of three years.

Other notable conductors
Other conductors with whom the orchestra has had close ties include Sir John Barbirolli, Bruno Walter, Leopold Stokowski, Albert Coates, Fritz Reiner, and Erich Leinsdorf; more recently, others have included Kurt Sanderling, Pierre Boulez, Leonard Bernstein, Charles Dutoit, Christoph Eschenbach, and Rafael Frühbeck de Burgos.

Many composers have conducted the Philharmonic in concerts and/or world premieres of their works, including Igor Stravinsky, William Kraft, John Harbison, Witold Lutosławski, Aaron Copland, Pierre Boulez, Steven Stucky, John Williams, Jerry Goldsmith, John Adams, Thomas Adès, and Esa-Pekka Salonen.

A number of the Philharmonic's Assistant/Associate Conductors have gone on to have notable careers in their own rights. These include Lawrence Foster, Calvin E. Simmons, and William Kraft under Mehta, Sidney Harth and Myung-whun Chung under Giulini, Heiichiro Ohyama and David Alan Miller under Previn, and Grant Gershon, Miguel Harth-Bedoya, Kristjan Järvi, and Alexander Mickelthwate under Salonen. Lionel Bringuier was originally named Assistant Conductor under Salonen before being promoted to Associate Conductor and, finally, Resident Conductor under Dudamel; since then, Mirga Gražinytė-Tyla has served as Assistant Conductor and Associate Conductor under Dudamel.

Other resident artists

Composers
 1981–1985: William Kraft
 1985–1988: John Harbison
 1987–1989: Rand Steiger
 1988–2009: Steven Stucky
 2009–present: John Adams

Kraft and Harbison held the title "Composer-in-Residence" as part of a Meet the Composer (MTC) sponsorship. Steiger was given the title "Composer-Fellow", serving as an assistant to both Harbison and Stucky.

Stucky was also a MTC "Composer-in-Residence" from 1988–1992, but was kept on as "New Music Advisor" after his official MTC-sponsored tenure ended; in 2000, his title was again changed to "Consulting Composer for New Music." In the end, his 21-year residency with the orchestra was the longest such relationship of any composer with an American orchestra.

Adams has been named the orchestra's "Creative Chair" beginning in Fall 2009.

Artistic director and creative chairs for Jazz
 2002–2006: Dianne Reeves
 2006–2010: Christian McBride
 2010–present: Herbie Hancock

Reeves was named the first "Creative Chair for Jazz" in March 2002. Instead of just focusing on summer programming, the new position involved the scheduling of jazz programming and educational workshops year round; as such, she led the development of the subscription jazz series the orchestra offered when it moved into Walt Disney Concert Hall. In addition, she was the first performer at the 2003 inaugural gala at the Walt Disney Concert Hall. Her contract was initially for two years, and was subsequently renewed for an additional two years.

McBride took over the position in 2006 for an initial two-year position that was subsequently renewed for an additional two years through to the start of the 2010 summer season at the Hollywood Bowl. In 2009, the orchestra introduced Hancock as McBride's eventual replacement.

In 1998, prior to the establishment of the Creative Chair for Jazz, John Clayton was given the title "Artistic Director of Jazz" at the Hollywood Bowl for a three-year term beginning with the 1999 summer season. His band, the Clayton-Hamilton Jazz Orchestra, acted as the resident jazz ensemble.

Recordings

The orchestra occasionally made 78-rpm recordings and LPs in the early years with Alfred Wallenstein and Leopold Stokowski for Capitol Records, and began recording regularly in the 1960s, for London/Decca, during the tenure of Zubin Mehta as music director. A healthy discography continued to grow with Carlo Maria Giulini on Deutsche Grammophon and André Previn on both Philips and Telarc Records. Michael Tilson Thomas, Leonard Bernstein, and Sir Simon Rattle also made several recordings with the orchestra in the 1980s, adding to their rising international profile. In recent years, Esa-Pekka Salonen has led recording sessions for Sony and Deutsche Grammophon. A recording of the Concerto for Orchestra by Béla Bartók released by Deutsche Grammophon in 2007 was the first recording by Gustavo Dudamel conducting the LA Phil.

The Los Angeles Philharmonic has performed music for motion pictures, such as the 1963 Stanley Kramer film It's a Mad, Mad, Mad, Mad World (composed by Ernest Gold), the pilot film of the original Battlestar Galactica TV show (composed by Stu Phillips and Glen A. Larson), and the most recent 2021 film version of the Broadway musical West Side Story (composed by Leonard Bernstein).  The LA Philharmonic also performed the first North American concert for the popular Final Fantasy franchise game music, Dear Friends: Music From Final Fantasy by Nobuo Uematsu. The orchestra has most recently recorded the sound track for the video game: BioShock 2'' as composed by Garry Schyman.

Recent world premieres

Management

Funding
The Los Angeles Philharmonic has seen its endowment booming in recent years, to around $255 million in 2017. In 2002, it received its largest-ever gift when the Walt and Lilly Disney family donated $25 million to endow the music directorship. David Bohnett donated $20 million in 2014 to endow the orchestra’s top administrative post and create a fund for technology and innovation.

As of 2019, the Los Angeles Philharmonic’s annual budget is at approximately $125 million.

Chief executives
 1969–1997: Ernest Fleischmann
 1998–2000: Willem Wijnbergen
 2000–2017: Deborah Borda
 2017–2019: Simon Woods
 2019–present: Chad Smith

See also

 Hollywood Bowl Orchestra
 Los Angeles Junior Philharmonic Orchestra
 Los Angeles Philharmonic discography
 Los Angeles Philharmonic Institute

References

External links
 Official Los Angeles Philharmonic website
 Official Hollywood Bowl website
 Gustavo Dudamel LA Phil Information and Performance Schedule
 Legendary LA Phil executive director Ernest Fleischmann in Conversation
 LA Phil LIVE

Orchestras based in California
American instrumental musical groups
Music of Los Angeles
Musical groups from Los Angeles
Musical groups established in 1919
Non-profit organizations based in Los Angeles
1919 establishments in California
Arts organizations established in 1919
Decca Records artists
Sony Classical Records artists